This is a chronology of warfare between the Romans and various Germanic peoples between 113 BC and 476. The nature of these wars varied through time between Roman conquest, Germanic uprisings and later Germanic invasions of the Western Roman Empire that started in the late second century BC. The series of conflicts was one factor which led to the ultimate downfall of the Western Roman Empire in particular and ancient Rome in general in 476.

List of campaigns
Cimbrian War (113–101 BC)
Battle of Noreia (112 BC)
Battle of Agen (107 BC)
Battle of Arausio (105 BC)
Battle of Aquae Sextiae (102 BC)
Battle of Vercellae (101 BC)
Battle of Vosges (58 BC)
Battle of the Sabis (57 BC)
Clades Lolliana (16 BC)
Early Imperial campaigns in Germania (12 BC–AD 16)
Battle of Arbalo (11 BC)
Battle of the Lupia River (11 BC)
Battle of the Teutoburg Forest (9 AD)
Campaign against the Marsi (14)
Campaign against the Chatti (15)
Campaign against the Bructeri (15)
Battle at Pontes Longi (15)
Battle of Idistaviso (16)
Battle of the Angrivarian Wall (16)
Campaign against the Chatti (16)
Battle of Baduhenna Wood (28)
Revolt of the Batavi (69–70)
Domitian's Campaign against the Chatti (82)
Clashes along the Danube (92)
Marcomannic Wars (166–180)
Battle of Carnuntum (170)
Crisis of the Third Century (235–284)
Battle at the Harzhorn (c. 235)
Battle of Nicopolis ad Istrum (250)
Battle of Beroe (250)
Battle of Philippopolis (250)
Battle of Abrittus (251)
Siege of Thessalonica (254)
Battle of Thermopylae (254)
Battle of Mediolanum (259)
Battle of Augusta Vindelicorum (260)
Siege of Mainz (268)
Battle of Lake Benacus (268)
Battle of Naissus (269)
Battle of Placentia (271)
Battle of Fano (271)
Battle of Pavia (271)
Battle of Lingones (298)
Battle of Vindonissa (298)
German and Sarmatian campaigns of Constantine (306–336)
Siege of Senonae (356)
Siege of Autun (356)
Battle of Durocortorum (356)
Battle of Brumath (356)
Battle of Argentoratum (357)
Great Conspiracy (367–368)
Battle of Solicinium (368)
Battle of Noviodunum (369)
Gothic War (376–382)
Battle of Marcianople (376)
Battle of the Willows (377)
Battle of Dibaltum (377)
Battle of Adrianople (378)
Siege of Adrianople (378)
Battle of Constantinople (378)
Battle of Thessalonica (380)
Battle of Argentovaria (378)
Massacre of Thessalonica (390)
Battle of the Frigidus (394)
Gothic War (401–403)
Siege of Asti (402)
Battle of Pollentia (402)
Battle of Verona (403)
Battle of Faesulae (406)
Battle of Moguntiacum (406)
Crossing of the Rhine (406)
Sack of Rome (410)
Siege of Hippo Regius (430–431)
Battle of Narbonne (436)
Battle of Vicus Helena (c. 448)
Battle of the Catalaunian Plains (451)
Sack of Aquileia (452)
Sack of Rome (455)
Battle of Aylesford (455)
Battle of Órbigo (456)
Battle of Arelate (458)
Battle of Cartagena (461)
Battle of Orleans (463)
Battle of Bassianae (468)
Battle of Cap Bon (468)
Battle of Bolia (469)
Battle of Déols (c. 469)
Battle of Ravenna (476)

Chronology

Second century BC

113–101 BC, Germanic Collision with the Roman Republic, Cimbrian War, Beginning of Germanic Wars.
112 BC, Battle of Noreia, Suicide of Consul Gnaeus Papirius Carbo.
107 BC, Helvetii defeat the Romans in the Battle of Agen, Consul Lucius Cassius Longinus dies in battle, General Lucius Calpurnius Piso Caesoninus dies in battle. (Battle against Allies of the Cimbri)
105 BC, Battle of Arausio, Execution of Roman General Marcus Aurelius Scaurus, Proconsul Quintus Servilius Caepio and Consul Gnaeus Mallius Maximus exiled.
102 BC, Consul Gaius Marius defeats the Sciri and Teutons in the Battle of Aquae Sextiae, Capture of King Teutobod, Extermination of the Teutons, Cimbri defeat Consul Quintus Lutatius Catulus in the Adige Valley.
101 BC, Roman consuls Gaius Marius and Manius Aquillius defeat the Cimbri in the Battle of Vercellae, King Boiorix dies in battle, Extermination of the Cimbri.

First century BC

58–51 BC, Conquest of Celtic Gaul to the Rhine by Julius Caesar, Gallic Wars.
58 BC, Caesar decisively defeats the Helvetii in the Battle of the Arar and the Battle of Bibracte, Caesar decisively defeats the Suevi, led by Ariovistus, in the Battle of Vosges.
57 BC, Battle of the Sabis.
55 BC, Caesar's intervention against Tencteri and Usipetes, Caesar defeats a Germanic army then massacres the women and children, totalling 430,000 people, somewhere near the Meuse and Rhine rivers, Caesar's first crossing of the Rhine against the Suevi, Caesar's invasions of Britain. Archaeologists with Vrije Universiteit Amsterdam claim they've found the first physical evidence that the battle took place in what is now the Netherlands, near the city of Kessel, North Brabant. 
54 BCE, Destruction of the legion Legio XIV Gemina by the Eburones led by Cativolcus and Ambiorix, Lucius Aurunculeius Cotta dies in battle, Quintus Titurius Sabinus dies in battle.
53 BC, Caesar's retaliation against the Eburones second crossing of the Rhine, Extermination of the Eburones.
52 BC, Fall of Celtic Gaul, Gaul becomes a Roman province.
46 BC, Execution of Vercingetorix the Celt.
30–29 BC, Rebellion of the Morini and Treveri with aid of the Suebi crushed by proconsuls Gaius Carrinas and Gaius Cornelius Gallus.
20 BC, Marcus Vipsanius Agrippa, Governor of Transalpine Gaul, Construction of military roads and especially the military road Lugdunum--Divodurum--Treverorum--Agrippinensium (from Lyon to Cologne).
16 BC, clades Lolliana, Destruction of the legion Legio V Alaudae by Sicambri and their allies, Fall of the Kingdom of Noricum.
16–13 BC, Emperor Augustus on the Rhine, Reorganization of the Three Gauls (capital Trier), Decision to fortify the left bank of the Rhine and conquest of Germania to the Elbe, Rome pays tribute to the Frisii, Begin of invasions east of the Rhine by Rome, Construction of the modern city of Mainz begins.
12–9 BC, Invasions of Drusus I up the Elbe from the North Sea, the Lippe and Main, Battle of the Lupia River, Cherusci, Marsi and Sicambri subdued, Chatti, Mattiaci, Tencteri and Usipetes are overrun, Frisii and other the Germans along the lower Rhine defeated, Canal of Drusus constructed, Establishment of new forts by Rome of Haltern am See, Xanten, Haltern, Oberaden, Holsterhausen, Anreppen and Beckinghausen.
9 BC, Creation of Magna Germania (capital Cologne), Pacification campaigns against the Germanic tribes by the Roman Empire, Marcomanni defeated and forced to flee into the territory of the Boii.
8–7 BC, Construction of military forts on both sides of the Weser, Deportation of 40,000 Sicambri and Suebi west of the Rhine.
6–2 BC, Lucius Domitius Ahenobarbus leads a Roman army across the Elbe. Construction of military roads, called the pontes longi, amid the vast swamps between the Rhine and the Ems. Hermunduri subdued and forced to flee into the territory of the Marcomanni.

First century

1–4 AD, Rise of the Chatti and Bructeri (immensum bellum) suppressed by Tiberius, who reaches the Elbe. Canninefates, Chattuarii, Cherusci are again subdued. Lombards, Semnones, Chauci and other tribes who dwelt on both sides of the Elbe are subjugated.
5, The Roman navy reaches the Cimbrian peninsula for the first time. Cimbri, Charudes, Semnones and other Germanic tribes who inhabit the region declare themselves friends of the Roman people.
6–9, Uprising in Illyricum, which cancels the major Roman project of war against Suevic Marcomanni. Romans forced to move eight of eleven legions present in Magna Germania to crush the rebellion in the Balkans and Pannonia.
6, Varus succeeds Saturninus as governor of Germania with the mission of peacekeeping and the implementation of tax and judicial administration.
9, clades Variana, Destruction of the legions XVII, XVIII and XIX by Arminius in the Battle of Teutoburg Forest, Suicide of Administrator Varus, Loss of military camps east of the Rhine., Roman Empire is forced to strategically withdraw from Germania. Pro-Roman Germanic coalition led by Maroboduus and Segestes turns against Arminius. The resistance of the Roman garrison of Aliso and the arrival of Roman reinforcements on the Rhine prevent Arminius from invading Gaul.
10–13, Military command of Tiberius in Germania and interventions in the valley of the Lippe, replaced by Germanicus, Construction of Limes Germanicus begins.
14, Mutiny of the legions of Germania.
14–16, Roman retaliation against Cherusci, Chatti, Bructeri and Marsi, capture of Thusnelda, recovery of two legionary standards lost in the Battle of the Teutoburg Forest.
Battles of Idistaviso and the Angrivarian Wall.

17, Cessation of military offensives east of the Rhine by Tiberius, Civil war between pro-Roman and anti-Roman Germanic tribes ends in a stalemate.
19, Death of Germanicus.
20, In a series of actions backed by Rome, Vannius came to power following the defeat of the Marcomannic king Catualda by the Hermunduri king of Vibilius, establishing the kingdom of Vannius (regnum Vannianum). Vannius was a client king of the Roman Empire and ruled from 20 AD to 50 AD. 
21, Assassination of Arminius.
28, Revolt of the Frisii, Tax collectors hanged, Romans defeated in the Battle of Baduhenna Wood.
41, Raid against the Chauci under Emperor Claudius, Recovery of third legionary standard lost in the Battle of the Teutoburg Forest.
47, Cnaeus Domitius Corbulo crosses the Rhine, defeats the Frisii and Chauci and occupies their territory. 
50, Raid against the Chatti under Emperor Claudius, Liberation of Roman prisoners.
54, Under Emperor Nero, Frisian raid repulsed.
69–70, Revolt of the Batavi, Destruction of 2 Roman legions by the Batavi, Rebellion crushed by Quintus Petillius Cerialis. 
72, Under Emperor Vespasian, Romans occupy and settle the Agri Decumates. 
82–83, Campaign against the Chatti under Emperor Domitian, Roman armies conquer the territory of Chatti with the help of Mattiaci, Hermunduri and Cherusci, Triboci and Nemetes subdued, Establishment of new Roman forts of Ladenburg, Neuenheim, Ladenburg, Sulz, Geislingen, Rottenburg an der Laaber, Burladingen, Gomadingen, Donnstetten, Urspring, Günzburg.
89, Lucius Antonius Saturninus, Legio XIV Gemina and Legio XXI Rapax revolt against Rome with aid of the Chatti.

Second century
c. 165, Invasion of Pannonia by Lombards and Ubii.
166–180, Germanic tribes invade the frontiers of the Roman Empire, specifically the provinces of Raetia and Moesia, Marcomannic Wars.
180, Goths reach the banks of the Black Sea.

Third century

213–214, Emperor Caracalla's successful campaign against the Alamanni, fortifications of Raetia and Germania Superior strengthened.
235–284, Crisis of the Third Century.
235, Battle at the Harzhorn.
238, Gothic raid on Istria, 
248–249, Raid in Marcianopolis by Goths.
250, Roman victory at the Battle of Nicopolis ad Istrum. Gothic victory at the Battle of Beroe. Siege and sack of Philippopolis by Goths led by Cniva.
251, Three Roman legions defeated by Goths at the Battle of Abritus, Emperor Decius dies in battle, Co-Emperor Herennius Etruscus dies in battle.
254, successful Graeco-Roman defense of Thessalonica at the Siege of Thessalonica. Successful Graeco-Roman defense of Achaea at the Battle of Thermopylae.
259, 300,000 Alemanni die in the Battle of Mediolanum (Milan).

259–260, Evacuation of the agrarian area Agri Decumates by the Roman Empire, Roman Empire retreats behind the Rhine.
260–274, Usurper Postumus, of possible Batavian origin, declares himself Emperor of the Gallic Empire including Roman Gaul, Roman Britain, Roman Spain and Germania. He assumed the title Germanicus Maximus after successfully campaigning against Franks and Alamanni.
c. 267–269, Invasion of the Goths, Gothic attacks on Marcianopolis and Chrysopolis, Sack of Byzantium.
268, Siege of Mainz, Battle of Lake Benacus, assassination of Gallic Emperor Postumus.
269, Battle of Naissus, end of Gothic Invasion.
271, Battle of Placentia, Battle of Fano, Battle of Pavia, Destruction of Alemannic army, Emperor Aurelian repelled another Gothic invasion but abandoned the province of Dacia north of Danube forever, Construction of the Aurelian Wall begins.
277–278, Emperor Probus's successful campaigns against Goths, Alamanni, Longiones, Franks and Burgundians. Reportedly, 400,000 barbarians were killed during this campaign, and the entire nation of the Lugii were extirpated.
286, Campaign against the Alamanni, Burgundians, Heruli and Chaibones under Emperor Maximian. 
287–288, Salian Franks, Chamavi and Frisii surrender and become subjects of the Roman Empire. Maximian move them to Germania Inferior to provide manpower and prevent the settlement of other Germanic tribes.
292, Constantius defeat the Franks who had settled at the mouth of the Rhineand and deport them to the nearby region of Toxandria providing a buffer along the northern Rhine and reducing his need to garrison the region.
296, Frisians deported into Roman territory as laeti.
298, Battle of Lingones.
298, Battle of Vindonissa.

Fourth century

306–310, Emperor Constantine the Great drives the Franks back beyond the Rhine and captures two of their kings, Ascaric and Merogaisus. The prisoners are fed to the beasts of Trier's amphitheater in the adventus (arrival) celebrations that followed. Constantine crosses the Rhine in 308 and 310, devastating the lands of the Franks and the Bructeri.
332, Roman invasion north of the Danube under Emperor Constantine the Great. Capture of Gothic Prince Ariaricus. Nearly one hundred thousand Goths die before submitting to Rome.
306–337, After thirty years of military campaigns Constantine regains control over a good part of the territories which had been abandoned by Gallienus and Aurelian. This included the Agri decumates from the Alemanni, the plain south of the Tisza (Banat) from the Sarmatians and Oltenia & Wallachia from the Goths.
c. 350, Infiltration of Germania Inferior by Franks.
354–355, Roman double victory over Alamanni under Emperor Constantius II.
356, Recapture of Colonia Agrippina (Cologne) by future Emperor Julian the Apostate, Siege of Senonae by Alamanni, Siege of Autun by Alemanni, Battle of Reims, Battle of Brumath.

357, Roman invasion of Alemannic territory led by general Barbatio and  Julian, Attack on Lugdunum (Lyon) by Laeti, End of coordinated operation against the Alemanni, Battle of Argentoratum, Capture of Alemannic King Chnodomarius, Julian crosses the Rhine at Moguntiacum and forces three Alamannic kingdoms to submit, Franks expelled from the basin of the Meuse.
358, Raid in the province of Raetia by Alemannic Juthungi, Destruction of Castra Regina (Regensburg) by Alemanni, Julian forces the Salian Franks into submission and expel the Chamavi back to Hamaland.
359, Execution of Roman General Barbatio, Recapture of Moguntiacum by Julian, Emperor Constantius II crosses the Danube at Brigetio (Komárom) and devastates the Quadian lands.
365–366, Invasion of Roman Gaul by Alemanni, Alemanni pushed out of Roman Gaul.
367, Sack of Moguntiacum by Alemanni, Battle of Solicinium, Roman army led by Eastern Emperor Valens defeats Gothic Greuthungi and captures their king Ermanaric.
367–368, Great Barbarian Conspiracy against Roman Britain and Roman Gaul by Saxons and Franks, Death of Nectaridus.
367–369, Attack on Gothic Thervingi under Eastern Emperor Valens.
368, Invasion of Alemannic territory under Emperor Valentinian the Great, Crossing of the Rhine by the Roman Empire.
369, Destruction of a fortress near Heidelberg by Alemanni.
370, Invasion of Roman Gaul by Saxons, Death of all invading Saxons, Invasion of Alemannic territory by Valentinian the Great, Rome captures thousands of Alemannic Bucinobantes, Deposition of Alemannic King Macrian, Hunnic raids on Gothic Greuthungi.
374, Assassination of Quadic King Gabinius, Invasion of former Illyricum by Quadi and Sarmatians.
375, Pillaging of Quadi lands by the Roman Empire, Western Emperor Valentinian the Great dies during peace negotiations.

376, Invasion of the Huns, Hunnic war against Visigoths and Ostrogoths, Suicide of Gothic King Ermanaric, Gothic King Vithimer dies in battle.
376–382, Hunnic raids on Gothic Thervingi (Visigoths), Gothic War, Plundering and destruction throughout the Balkans by Goths.
377, Battle of the Willows, Gothic chieftain Farnobius dies in battle.
378, Battle of Adrianople, Eastern Emperor Valens dies in battle, Begin of the Fall of the Western Roman Empire.
377–378, Invasion of Thrace and Moesia by Gothic Greuthungi led by chieftain Alatheus.
378, Invasion of Alsace by Alemanni, Battle of Argentovaria, Extermination of Alemannic Lentienses, Alemannic King Priarius dies in battle.
380, Battle of Thessalonica, Death of Gothic chieftain Fritigern, Begin of naval raids by Saxons, Begin of the Migration of the Saxons.
382, Peace between Rome and the Goths, Large Gothic contingents of Thervingi, Taifali and Victohali settle along the southern Danube frontier in the province of Thrace.
383, Failed raid in the province of Raetia by Alemannic Juthungi.
387, Failed Invasion of Thrace and Moesia by Gothic Greuthungi led by chieftain Alatheus, Greuthungi chieftain Alatheus dies in battle.
390, Massacre of Thessalonica.
392, Emperor Valentinian II is hanged, Frankish General Arbogast names Eugenius to be Western Emperor.
394, 20,000 Gothic mercenaries support Eastern Emperor Theodosius the Great in the Battle of the Frigidus, Suicide of Frankish General Arbogast, Execution of puppet Western Emperor Eugenius.
395, Assassination of Consul Rufinus by Gothic mercenaries.

Fifth century

For the timeline of events in Britannia after its abandonment by Emperor Valentinian III, see Timeline of conflict in Anglo-Saxon Britain.

401–402, Raid in Raetia by Vandals.
401–403, Invasion of Italy by Visigoths under Alaric I, Gothic War.
402, Gothic Siege of Asti lifted by Stilicho.
402, Alaric defeated by Stilicho at the Battle of Pollentia.
403, Alaric's army destroyed at the Battle of Verona, Visigoths pushed into former Illyricum by Stilicho.
405–406, Siege of Florentia, Battle of Faesulae, execution of Gothic King Radagaisus (August 406), 12,000 Gothic higher-status fighters are drafted into the Roman army. War between Frankish federates and Vandals (Vandal king Godigisel dies in battle), "Battle of Moguntiacum" (Alans under King Respendial rescue the Vandals), Crossing of the Rhine by Vandals, Suebi, Burgundians (?) and Alans (405–406, exact date disputed).
406, Usurpation of Marcus in Britannia (late 406), supposedly in response to the Crossing of the Rhine.
408, Failed invasion of Moesia by Huns and Germanic mercenaries led by Uldin the Hun, Capture of thousands of Germanic mercenaries, Execution of Roman General Stilicho (August), Slaughter of wives and children of barbarian foederati, Siege of Rome by Visigoths, Attacks on Roman Britain by Saxons.

409, second Siege of Rome by Visigoths. Invasion of Roman Spain by Vandals, Suebi (Marcomanni, Quadi, Buri) and Alans (September or October 409).
410, Sack of Rome by Visigoths, beginning of attacks on Vandals by Visigoths, Begin of Barbarian raids by Picts, Scoti and Irish Celts, End of Roman rule in Britain, Suevi establish a kingdom in Galicia.
411, Jovinus declares himself Western Roman Emperor with aid of the Burgundians, Franks and Alans, Burgundians establish a Kingdom left of the Rhine under King Gundahar. First sack of Trier by the Franks
413, Capture of Narbonne and Toulouse by Visigoths led by King Ataulf. Usurper Jovinus is executed. Second sack of Trier by the Franks.
421, Third sack of Trier by the Franks.
422, Capture and Execution of Frankish King Theudemeres by Romans, Attack on Vandals by Romans.
426–436, Campaigns against the Visigoths in southern Gaul under Western Emperor Valentinian III, Battle of Narbonne, Capture of Visigothic chieftain Anaolsus.
428–431, Failed Roman campaigns against Salian Franks, Alemannic Juthungi on the Rhine and Danube, Germanus of Auxerre leads Romano-Britons to a victory against Saxon raiders.	

428 or 435, Fourth sack of Trier by the Franks.
429–439, Invasion of Africa by Vandals led by Vandal King Genseric, Siege of Hippo Regius, Capture of Carthage by Vandals, Capture of Roman navy by Vandals, Pillaging of Sicily, Begin of pirate raids by Vandals.
431, Invasion to the Somme River by Salian Franks.
436–437, Invasion of Burgundian Rhineland by Hun mercenaries controlled by Rome, Burgundian King Gundahar dies in battle.
c. 443, Britain plunges into civil war, Groans of the Britons, Britain is abandoned by Western Emperor Valentinian III.
c. 445–450, Invasion of Northern Gaul by Salian Franks led by king Chlodio, who conqueres the cities of Tournai and Cambrai.
448, Defeat of the Salian Franks in the Battle of Vicus Helena by Roman General Aëtius. Frankish King Chlodio dies in battle.
451, Invasion of Gaul by the Huns with Frankish, Gothic and Burgundian mercenaries led by Attila the Hun, Sack of Trier, Attack on Metz, Siege of Orléans, Coalition of Romans, Franks and Visigoths led by General Aëtius stop the Huns in the Battle of Châlons, Visigothic King Theodoric I dies in battle.
452, Invasion of northern Italy under Attila the Hun: Sack of Aquileia, Vicetia, Verona, Brixia, Bergamum and Milan.
453, Hunnic and Germanic attacks on Constantinople, Attila the Hun dies during heavy drinking.
454, Assassination of Roman General Aëtius, Gepids establish a kingdom in Pannonia.
455, Sack of Rome by Vandals, Capture of Empress Licinia Eudoxia by Vandals.
456, Visigoths defeat the Suebic Kingdom of Galicia in the Battle of Órbigo.
458, Emperor Majorian leads the Roman army to a victory over the Vandals near Sinuessa, Roman victory over the Visigoths in southern Gaul in the Battle of Arelate.

459, Seizure of Trier by Franks, Roman reconquest of southern Gaul and most of Hispania under Emperor Majorian.
460, Roman victory over the Suebi at Lucus Augusti, Roman fleet is destroyed by traitors paid by the Vandals, Attack on the kingdom of the Vandals cancelled.
461, Seventeen Vandal ships destroy forty Roman ships in a surprise attack.
463, Battle of Orleans.
465, Ostrogothic King Valamir dies in battle.
468, Invasion of the Vandal Kingdom by the Byzantine Empire, Defeat of the Byzantine Empire by the Vandals in the Battle of Cape Bon.
469, Ostrogoths decisively defeat an alliance of pro-Roman Germanic forces in the Battle of Bolia, Fall of the Hunnic Empire, Visigoths thwarted an attack by an alliance of Bretons and Romans in the Battle of Déols.
472, Revolt in Thrace by Ostrogoths led by chieftain Theodoric Strabo.
476, Revolt of Heruli, Sciri and Turcilingi mercenaries, Battle of Ravenna, Germanic Heruli chieftain Odoacer becomes King of Italy, Deposition of Romulus Augustulus, the last de facto Western Roman Emperor, Fall of the Western Roman Empire.

See also
Contact between Germanic tribes and the Roman Empire
Gothic and Vandal warfare
Anglo-Saxon warfare
Furor Teutonicus
Germanic Iron Age
Germanic Heroic Age
Timeline of Anglo-Saxon settlement in Britain
Timeline of Germanic kingdoms in the Iberian peninsula
Operation Achse
Roman-Persian wars

References

Works cited

Further reading
Florus on the Germanic wars, translated by E.S. Forster, www.livius.org October 2010
The Germanic Wars, second century, www.unrv.com October 2010
Roman Germanic Wars, 12 BC to 17 AD, www.heritage-history.com October 2010
Timeline of Ancient Europe, www.earth-history.com October 2010
Speidel, Michael, 2004, Ancient Germanic warriors: Warrior styles from Trajan's column to Icelandic sagas. (book)

1st-millennium BC conflicts
1st-millennium conflicts
Military history of Germany
Wars involving the Roman Republic
Wars involving the Roman Empire
Battles involving the Roman Empire
Iron Age Europe
Wars involving Germanic peoples